The Zigina River is a river of southern Ethiopia. It is a south-flowing tributary of the Omo River, entering it on the right bank.

See also
List of rivers of Ethiopia

References

Omo River (Ethiopia)
Rivers of Ethiopia